The 1998–99 North of Scotland Cup was won by Elgin City

1998–99 Competing Clubs
Brora Rangers
Clachnacuddin
Elgin City
Forres Mechanics
Fort William
Golspie Sutherland
Inverness Caledonian Thistle 'A'
Lossiemouth
Nairn County
Ross County 'A'
Rothes
Wick Academy

First round

Second round

Semi finals

Final

References

The Official Football Association Non League Club Directory 2000  

North of Scotland Cup seasons